Giacomo Vittorio Appiani (died 1482) was a Roman Catholic prelate who served as Bishop of Gravina di Puglia (1473–1482).

Biography
In 1473, Giacomo Vittorio Appiani was appointed during the papacy of Pope Sixtus IV as Bishop of Gravina di Puglia.
He served as Bishop of Gravina di Puglia until his death in 1482.

References

External links and additional sources
 (for Chronology of Bishops) 
 (for Chronology of Bishops) 

15th-century Italian Roman Catholic bishops
Bishops appointed by Pope Sixtus IV
1482 deaths